Euproctis cervina is a moth of the family Erebidae first described by Frederic Moore in 1877. It is found in Sri Lanka.

References

Moths of Asia
Moths described in 1877